Tangerhütte is a town in the district of Stendal, in Saxony-Anhalt, Germany. It has a population of 10,612 (2020) and is situated on the river Tanger, approximately 20 km south of Stendal.

Geography 
The town is situated near the river Tanger which the town was named after. Tangerhütte station is situated on the Magdeburg-Wittenberge railway.

Divisions 
The town Tangerhütte consists of the following 19 Ortschaften or municipal divisions, that were all independent municipalities until 31 May 2010:

Bellingen
Birkholz
Bittkau
Cobbel
Demker
Grieben
Hüselitz
Jerchel
Kehnert
Lüderitz
Ringfurth
Schelldorf
Schernebeck
Schönwalde
Tangerhütte
Uchtdorf
Uetz
Weißewarte
Windberge

History 
In 1950, the municipality of Briest (Altmark) became part of Tangerhütte. The estate of Briest had been owned by the House of Bismarck since 1345.

References

Towns in Saxony-Anhalt
 
Stendal (district)